Richard Buckley may refer to:
Lord Buckley (Richard Myrle Buckley, 1906–1960), American stage performer
Richard Buckley (journalist) (1948–2021), American LGBT writer and journalist and husband of Tom Ford
Richard Buckley (courtier) (1928–2022), Royal Navy officer and courtier
Richard Buckley, New Zealand farmer whose trousers exploded
Dick Buckley (baseball) (Richard D. Buckley) (1858–1929), American Major League Baseball player